Eleutheromyces is a genus of fungi belonging to the family Helicogoniaceae.

The species of this genus are found in Europe and Northern America.

Species:

Eleutheromyces longispora 
Eleutheromyces pseudosubulatus 
Eleutheromyces subulatus

References

Leotiomycetes
Leotiomycetes genera